Jatun Q'asa (Quechua jatun, hatun big, great, q'asa mountain pass, "great mountain pass", also spelled Jatun Khasa) is a  mountain in the Bolivian Andes. It is located in the Chuquisaca Department, Oropeza Province, on the border of the municipalities of Sucre and Yotala.

References 

Mountains of Chuquisaca Department